Lak (лакку маз, lakːu maz) is a Northeast Caucasian language forming its own branch within this family. It is the language of the Lak people from the Russian autonomous republic of Dagestan, where it is one of six standardized languages. It is spoken by about 157,000 people.

History

In 1864 Russian ethnographer and linguist P. K. Uslar wrote: "Kazikumukh grammar or as I called it for short in the native language, the Lak grammar, Lakku maz, the Lak language, is ready".

In 1890, P. K. Uslar compiled a textbook on Lak grammar titled The Lak Language. It stated under the title "Lak alphabet": "The proposed alphabet is written for  people who name themselves collectively Lak, genitive Lakral. From among these people each one is named separately Lakkuchu 'Lakian man', the woman – Lakkusharssa 'Lakian woman'. Their homeland they name Lakral kIanu – 'Lak place'."

Lak has throughout the centuries adopted a number of loanwords from Arabic, Turkish, Persian, and Russian. Ever since Dagestan was part of the Soviet Union and later Russia, the largest portion of loanwords have come from Russian, especially political and technical vocabulary. There is a newspaper and broadcasting station in Lak.

In accordance with the Constitution of the Republic of Dagestan of 1994, Lak was named as the state language along with Russian and some other major languages spoken in Dagestan (about 20 local languages are unwritten and have no official status). Lak is used as a teaching tool in elementary school and taught as a subject in secondary schools, vocational schools and universities. There is a Lak newspaper, "Ilchi".

The standard Lak language is based on the dialect of the city of Kumukh. This city should not be confused with the Kumyk ethnic group, a Turkic people also present in the Caucasus. Lak has the following dialects: Kumukh, Vitskhi, Arakul, Balkhar, Shadni, Shalib, Vikhli, Kuli, and Kaya.

Initially Lak by lexicon was found to be close to Dargin and the two were often combined in one Lak–Dargin subgroup of Dagestani languages. However, further research has led linguists to conclude that this association was insufficient.

Phonology

Consonants 

The consonants in orange are given by Schulze, but not by TITUS. The consonant /ʡ/ (grey) is given by TITUS, but not by Schulze.
The sound transcribed here as a glottal stop is named rather ambiguously a "glottalic laryngeal" by both sources.

Vowels 
Five vowels are presented as /a, e, i, o, u/. Three vowels /i, a, u/ are also pharyngealized as /iˤ, aˤ, uˤ/, and also have fronted allophones of [e, æ, œ].

Grammar
Lak is one of the few North East Caucasian languages with verbal agreement for person. It generally only distinguishes between speech-act participants and non-speech-act participants. In other words, the first- and second-person agreement markers are the same.

The free pronouns of Lak do distinguish first and second person.

Writing systems
The Lak language was written using the Arabic script until 1928. Afterwards it was written with a Latin alphabet for ten years, and since 1938 it has been written in Cyrillic.

The Lak alphabet in Cyrillic initially included 48 letters and later 54 letters with double letters as "тт", "пп", "чч", "хьхь", etc.:

References

External links

Lak Grammar by Wolfgang Schulze
Transliteration of Lak
Lak House – Lak culture and society site
Lak words

 
Northeast Caucasian languages
Languages of Russia
Vulnerable languages
Dagestan
Laks (Caucasus)